Lorraine Birabil is an American attorney and politician who served briefly as a member of the Texas House of Representatives from the 100th district.

Early life and education 
Born and raised in North Texas, Birabil earned a Bachelor of Science in biology and Bachelor of Arts in political science from the University of North Texas. She then earned a Juris Doctor from the Texas A&M University School of Law.

Career 
A Democrat, she was elected to the House in a 2020 special election, succeeding Eric Johnson, who had been elected mayor of Dallas. In the July 2020 Democratic primary for a full term in the Texas House of Representatives, Birabil was narrowly defeated by Jasmine Crockett. She left office in January 2021 and declined to run again when Crockett vacated the seat to run for Congress.

References 

Living people
Democratic Party members of the Texas House of Representatives
University of North Texas alumni
Texas A&M University alumni
Texas lawyers
Year of birth missing (living people)
21st-century American politicians
21st-century American women politicians